Alessandra is a female given name of Italian origin, meaning defender of men. It is the Italian form of the female given name Alexandra and the female form of the male given name Alessandro. 

Alessandra may refer to:

 Alessandra Ambrosio (born 1981), Brazilian supermodel
 Alessandra Biaggi (born 1986), American, New York State Senator
 Alessandra Cappa (born 1981), Italian swimmer
 Alessandra Cappellotto (born 1968), Italian cyclist
 Alessandra de Osma (born 1989), Peruvian attorney and model, and Hanoverian princess by marriage
 Alessandra De Rossi (born 1984), Filipino actress
 Alessandra Ferri (born 1963), Italian ballerina
 Alessandra Januário dos Santos (born 1988), Brazilian volleyballer
 Alessandra Lunardi (born 1958), Italian mathematician
 Alessandra Mastronardi (born 1986), Italian actress
 Alessandra Mele (born 2002), Norwegian-Italian singer
 Alessandra Mirka Gatti (born 1969), Italian singer
 Alessandra Mussolini (born 1962), Italian politician
 Alessandra Negrini (born 1970), Brazilian actress
 Alessandra Paonessa (born 1989), Canadian opera singer
 Alessandra Pucci (born 1942), Australian biochemist and entrepreneur
 Alessandra Riegler (born 1961), Italian chess player
 Alessandra Rosaldo (born 1971), Mexican singer and actress
 Alessandra Silvestri-Levy (born 1972), Brazilian art curator and writer
 Alessandra Stanley (born 1955), American journalist
 Alessandra Torresani (born 1987), American actress, also credited by her birth name, Alessandra Toreson
 Flávia Alessandra (born 1974), Brazilian actress, full name Flávia Alessandra Martins da Costa

People with the surname
Lewis Alessandra (born 1989), English footballer

References

Feminine given names
Italian feminine given names